Mark Polish and Michael Polish (born October 30, 1970), known informally as the Polish brothers, are American twin screenwriters and film producers. Michael usually directs their films, and Mark often has an acting role.

Life
The Polish brothers were born in El Centro, California. Their father is from Montana, and is of part Austrian ancestry. He used to work at the DEA in Sacramento. Their paternal grandfather worked on the dams of Montana. Their mother's family is Mexican. The brothers were raised Catholic.

Career
The Polish brothers began their film career with the 1999 Sundance debut of their first feature, Twin Falls Idaho. The identical twin siblings wrote and starred in the tale of conjoined twins. Michael directed. Sony Pictures Classics bought the rights for theatrical distribution of the film, which Janet Maslin of The New York Times said had "style, gravity and originality to spare."

Michael Polish, in an interview with Robert K. Elder for the book The Film That Changed My Life said much of his own inspiration came from watching Once Upon a Time in America in his youth.

 ... Internally it speaks to me, as just a human, a person alone. I can watch this movie alone and be a fan. Whether a filmmaker or not, I can be a fan because it has so many symbols and situations that reflect life itself, growing up. Even growing up in the suburbs, you still have friendships the same way these kids have friendships.

In 2000, the Polish brothers followed up Twin Falls with Jackpot, the story of a deluded karaoke singer (Jon Gries) on a tour of American dive-bars. It won the 2001 Independent Spirit John Cassavetes Award and the 2001 Seattle International Film Festival New American Cinema Award. The film was distributed theatrically by Sony Pictures Classics.

In 2002, the brothers were offered the opportunity to make a mainstream film. Instead, they began to put together the independent film Northfork.  When financing collapsed days before principal photography, the filmmakers signed their house to creditors, and paid for their movie with personal credit cards. Starring James Woods and Nick Nolte, Northfork was chosen as an early selection by the Sundance Film Festival, and when the movie premiered at Sundance in 2003, Roger Ebert called it "a masterpiece."

In 2005, the Polish brothers, along with producing partner Jonathan Sheldon, wrote and released The Declaration of Independent Filmmaking. The book, a how-to guide for first-time, do-it-yourself filmmakers, follows the filmmaking process and gives firsthand accounts of the Polish Brothers' travails in making their films. The Library Journal said the Polish Brothers "write in a way that illuminates the details more clearly than most technical scribes."

In 2006, the brothers would team with Warner Independent for their fourth film, The Astronaut Farmer about a former NASA astronaut, Charles Farmer (Billy Bob Thornton), who has been obsessively building a rocket in his barn. Warner Bros. released it throughout North America in 2007.

The brothers then shot two films back-to-back, just days apart while launching their new production company Prohibition Pictures with partners Ken Johnson, Janet DuBois, and Jonathan Sheldon. The Polish Brothers' fifth film, Manure (with Billy Bob Thornton and Téa Leoni) began shooting on May 27, 2008 and was released at the Sundance Festival the following year as The Smell of Success), and the Polish Brothers' sixth film, Stay Cool (with Winona Ryder, Mark Polish, Chevy Chase, Sean Astin, Hilary Duff, Jon Cryer, Josh Holloway) began filming in July 2008 (and was shown at Tribeca Festival in 2009).

In May 2010, the Polish brothers began filming For Lovers Only. Said to be inspired by the French New Wave and Claude Lelouch's 1966 double Oscar-winner A Man and a Woman, the romance focuses on a journalist Stana Katic (Castle) in Paris on assignment, who runs into a lover (Mark Polish) from her past. Presumably enraptured by reconciliation, the pair flee Paris and travel "by train, car, and motorcycle as their love affair takes them across France from Normandy to St. Tropez."

In 2013, Michael directed American adventure drama, Big Sur, an adaptation of the 1962 novel of the same name by Jack Kerouac. The story is based on the time Kerouac spent in Big Sur, California and his three brief sojourns to friend Lawrence Ferlinghetti's cabin in Bixby Canyon. The film debuted on January 23, 2013 at the 2013 Sundance Film Festival, where it received generally positive reviews.

In 2014, it was announced that Mark would write, direct, and star in Headlock. The film also starred Dianna Agron and Andy Garcia.

Personal life
In July 2011, Michael began dating actress Kate Bosworth, and on August 31, 2013, the couple married in Philipsburg, Montana. They separated in August 2021.

Filmography
Hellraiser: Bloodline (1996) – Twin Cenobite No. 1 (Michael) – Twin Cenobite No. 2 (Mark) (acting only)
Twin Falls Idaho (1999) (Michael – director, cowriter, actor. Mark – cowriter, actor)
Jackpot (2001) (Michael – director, cowriter. Mark – cowriter)
The Good Thief (2002) (Mark - actor, Michael - actor)
Northfork (2003) (Michael – director, cowriter. Mark – cowriter, actor)
The Astronaut Farmer (2006) (Michael – director, cowriter. Mark – cowriter, actor)
The Smell of Success (2009) (Michael – director, cowriter. Mark – cowriter, actor)
Stay Cool (2009) (Michael – director. Mark - writer)
For Lovers Only (2010, online; 2011, film festival release) (Michael – coproducer, director. Mark – coproducer, writer, actor)
Big Sur (2013) (Michael – coproducer, director, writer)
Amnesiac (2014) (Michael – director)
90 Minutes in Heaven (2015) (Michael – coproducer, director, writer)
Hot Bot (2016) (Michael – director, cowriter. Mark – writer)
Nona (2017) (Michael – director, writer) 
Against the Clock (2019) (Mark – director, writer, actor) 
One of the Good Ones (2019) (Michael – executive producer)
Force of Nature (2020) (Michael – director)
American Traitor: The Trial of Axis Sally (2021 film) (Michael – director) 
Terror on the Prairie (2022) (Michael - director)

Bibliography
''The Declaration of Independent Filmmaking: An Insider's Guide to Making Movies Outside of Hollywood, with Jonathan Sheldon. Mariner Books 2005,

References

External links 

1970 births
Film producers from California
Screenwriters from California
Independent Spirit Award winners
Living people
Sibling duos
Sibling filmmakers
American twins
People from El Centro, California
American film directors of Mexican descent
Film directors from California